"Feed Me with Your Kiss" is a song by the alternative rock band My Bloody Valentine, and was released as a single and also the lead track to the EP of the same name through Creation Records. It is the seventh track and lead single from the band's debut studio album Isn't Anything. It was released on 31 October 1988.

Critical reception

On the EP, AllMusic critic Nitsuh Abebe wrote: "They don't feel like songs that weren't quite good enough for Isn't Anything; they might display some of the stylistic tendencies of the Ecstasy and Wine period, but they're just as worthwhile as the album tracks."

In another review, Stewart Mason of Allmusic thought that the track "more in keeping with the moody, gothy rock of My Bloody Valentine's much-inferior earliest records." Mason also stated that the track "has a peculiar feel, pitched somewhere between the bombastic self-importance of mid-'80s Nick Cave and the ethereality of prime Cocteau Twins, mixed with the same sort of slightly dopey S&M-tinged lyrics as the roughly contemporaneous "Cigarette in Your Bed," proving that it was in the long run a very smart idea for Kevin Shields to completely bury the lyrics on My Bloody Valentine's later work." Digital Spy commended the "ear-splitting garage rock scuzz of the title track.

Track listing

Limited to 1,000 copies, many of which showed side B misprinted as "Emptiness Inside"

Reissued on CD in April 1990 (CRESCD061)

Mercury Records 12-inch from November 1988 (Mercury 874 343-1), combining tracks from this EP and its predecessor, You Made Me Realise.

Personnel
Kevin Shields – vocals, guitar
Bilinda Butcher – vocals, guitar
Colm Ó Cíosóig – drums
Debbie Googe – bass guitar
My Bloody Valentine – production

References

Songs about kissing
My Bloody Valentine (band) EPs
1988 singles
Creation Records singles
My Bloody Valentine (band) songs
Songs written by Kevin Shields
Garage rock songs